SM U-40 or U-XL was a U-27 class U-boat or submarine for the Austro-Hungarian Navy. U-40, built by the Austrian firm of Cantiere Navale Triestino (CNT) at the Pola Navy Yard, was launched in April 1917 and commissioned in August.

She displaced nearly  when surfaced and over  when submerged. She was armed with two bow torpedo tubes and could carry a load of up to four torpedoes. She was also equipped with a  deck gun and a machine gun.

During her service career, U-40 sank three ships and damaged three others, sending a combined tonnage of 9,838 to the bottom. U-40 was at Fiume at war's end and was surrendered at Venice in March 1919. She was granted to Italy as a war reparation and broken up the following year.

Design and construction 

After these steps alleviated their most urgent needs, the Austro-Hungarian Navy selected the German Type UB II design for its newest submarines in mid 1915. The Germans were reluctant to allocate any of their wartime resources to Austro-Hungarian construction, but were willing to sell plans for up to six of the UB II boats to be constructed under license in Austria-Hungary. The Navy agreed to the proposal and purchased the plans from AG Weser of Bremen.

U-40 displaced  surfaced and  submerged. She was capable of  while surfaced and  while submerged. U-27-class boats were designed for a crew of 23–24.

U-40 was armed with two  bow torpedo tubes and could carry a complement of four torpedoes. She was also equipped with a 75 mm/26 (3.0 in) deck gun and an  machine gun.

U-40 was ordered from Cantiere Navale Triestino (CNT) after funds for her purchase were raised and donated to the Austro-Hungarian Navy by the Österreichischen Flottenverein. She was laid down on 8 August 1916 at the Pola Navy Yard, and launched on 21 April 1917.

Service career 
One month later, on 4 August, the SM U-40 was commissioned into the Austro-Hungarian Navy under the command of Linienschiffsleutnant Johann Krsnjavi.

U-40 departed on her first patrol on 5 August, sailing through the Brioni islands. Two days out, the submarine came under attack by two aircraft. Bombs from the two planes damaged one of U-40s fuel tanks but the U-boat was able to continue to her Mediterranean patrol area. There, east of Malta, she unsuccessfully attacked a steamer on the 15th. Four days later—a little more than two weeks after the U-boat's commissioning—Krsnjavi and U-40 achieved their first kills. The ship's master and twelve other crewmen were killed in the attack.

Ten days later, after a rendezvous with sister boat  in the Ionian Sea, U-40 damaged the collier Clifftower in a torpedo attack. Clifftower, carrying a load of coal from Newcastle, suffered no casualties in the attack. After successfully passing through the Otranto Barrage on 31 August, U-40 concluded her first patrol when she docked at Cattaro on 3 September. On 15 October, U-40 set out from Cattaro on her next patrol. She spent two days, 16 to 18 October, patrolling off Durazzo. Departing there, she headed for her assigned patrol area off Port Said. On 20 October, two aircraft from Corfu forced Krsnjavi to make an emergency dive, but the U-boat escaped damage. On 25 October, U-40  encountered a severe storm that damager one of her fuel tanks. Three days later, Krsnjavi ordered the boat back to port when the gyrocompass broke. The boat made Cattaro on 1 November and underwent repairs there over the next five weeks.

Departing from Cattaro on her third patrol on 10 December, Krsnjavi steered the boat to her patrol area: cruising the Mediterranean between Alexandria and Malta. The first day of the new year brought U-40s next success. A torpedo attack two days later on another steamer produced no result. Having exhausted her supply of torpedoes, U-40 headed back to port. On 6 January, the U-boat's deck gun was used to destroy a floating mine. The following day the boat was fired upon by three drifters of the Otranto Barrage but safely returned to Cattaro on 8 January.

After two month at Cattaro, Krsnjavi lead U-40 out on her fourth patrol on 5 March. The U-boat came under attack on consecutive days while headed into the Mediterranean. On 9 March, two destroyers forced her to crash dive, while the following day a pair of aircraft did the same. Nine days later, U-40 torpedoed the Canadian steamer Lord Ormonde, but only damaged the 3,914 GRT ship. On 20 March, U-40 sent the Greek cargo ship Antonios M. Theophilatos and her load of ammunition to the bottom. U-40 launched a torpedo attack and damaged a British steamer Demodocus in a convoy on 23 March. U-40 ended her patrol on 2 April at Cattaro. Gibson and Prendergast report on the claim of the Italian torpedo boat  that she had depth charged and sunk U-40 in the Adriatic on 26 April. As Gibson and Prendergast note, U-40 did not sink that day, discrediting the report. U-40 did depart from Cattaro for Pola at the end of May to undergo repairs for the next two months.

U-40 departed from Pola on 5 August, but developed a leak a few days out and put in at Cattaro on 10 August. The U-boat returned to Pola about two weeks later and remained there until October. While at Pola, command of U-40 passed to Linienschiffsleutnant Wladimir Pfeifer on 19 September. On 19 October, U-40 departed Pola and eventually arrived at Fiume, where she remained through the end of the war. The U-boat was taken to Venice on 23 March 1919, where she was surrendered to the Italians as a war reparation. She was scrapped at Venice the following year. In her 15-month service career, U-40 sank three ships with a combined tonnage of 9,838, and damaged three others.

Summary of raiding history

Notes

References

Bibliography 

 
 
 
 
 

U-27-class submarines (Austria-Hungary)
U-boats commissioned in 1917
1917 ships
World War I submarines of Austria-Hungary
Ships built in Pola